Anis Lounifi (born 7 January 1978) is a retired Tunisian judoka.

References

External links
 
 
 

1978 births
Living people
Tunisian male judoka
Judoka at the 2000 Summer Olympics
Judoka at the 2004 Summer Olympics
Olympic judoka of Tunisia
World judo champions
Sportspeople from Tunis
Mediterranean Games gold medalists for Tunisia
Mediterranean Games medalists in judo
Competitors at the 2001 Mediterranean Games
African Games medalists in judo
African Games silver medalists for Tunisia
Competitors at the 1999 All-Africa Games
20th-century Tunisian people
21st-century Tunisian people